Judge Potter may refer to:

Emery D. Potter (1804–1896), judge of the circuit court for the northern counties of Ohio, and of the court of common pleas
Henry Potter (judge) (1766–1857), judge of the United States District Court for the Albemarle, Cape Fear and Pamptico Districts of North Carolina
John William Potter (1918–2013), judge of the United States District Court for the Northern District of Ohio
Mark Potter (judge) (born 1937), English judge of the High Court of Justice, Queen's Bench Division and of the Northern Circuit before becoming a Lord Justice of Appeal
Robert Daniel Potter (1923–2009), judge of the United States District Court for the Western District of North Carolina

See also
Justice Potter (disambiguation)